HMS Spey was a 10-gun  built for the Royal Navy during the 1820s. She was wrecked in 1840.

Description
The ship's tonnage was 230 64/94 tons burthen. The Cherokee class was armed with two 6-pounder cannon and eight 18-pounder carronades. The ships had a crew of 52 officers and ratings.

Construction and career
Spey, the second ship of her name to serve in the Royal Navy, was ordered on 25 March 1823, laid down in July 1825 at Pembroke Dockyard, Wales, and launched on 6 October 1827. She was completed on 17 November 1828 at Plymouth Dockyard.

Spey was wrecked on a reef in the Bahama Channel on 24 November 1841. All passengers and crew were rescued.

Notes

References

 

Cherokee-class brig-sloops
1827 ships
Ships built in Pembroke Dock
Maritime incidents in November 1840